Holovashivka (Ukrainian: Головашівка) is a railway station in Holovashivka, Sumy Oblast, Ukraine. The station serves as a minor passenger station as well as a minor freight yard. It is on the Sumy Branch of Southern Railways on the Bilopillya-Basy line.

Passenger service

Only suburban trains stop at Holovashivka station.

Notes

 Tariff Guide No. 4. Book 1 (as of 05/15/2021) (Russian) Archived 05/15/2021.
 Ukraine. Atlas of Railways. Mirilo 1: 750 000. - K .: DNVP "Cartography", 2008. - 80 p. - ISBN 978-966-475-082-7.

References

External links
Information on Holovashivka station on railwayz.info
Schedule for suburban trains and passenger trains
Holovashivka station on rail trips

Railway stations in Sumy Oblast
Sumy
Buildings and structures in Sumy Oblast